Henry Wakefield may refer to:

 Henry Wakefield (bishop of Worcester) (died 1395), medieval bishop of Worcester
 Henry Wakefield (bishop of Birmingham) (1854–1933), Anglican bishop and author
 Henry Wakefield (American football) (1899–1962), American football player